"Like the Way I Do" is a song by American singer-songwriter Melissa Etheridge, released as the second US single from her first album, Melissa Etheridge (1988). In the United Kingdom, "Don't You Need" was released as the second single.

Song information
The song was written years before the album was recorded. Melissa Etheridge had already played it during her live concerts, where it was the first of her own compositions that kept being requested by the audience. The intro of the song was created by coincidence when the singer played one of her other songs—"I Want You"—backwards on a cassette recorder.

"Like the Way I Do" is one of Etheridge's most famous songs and in her autobiography, she says, ""Like the Way I Do" is definitely one of my best songs. It is filled with passion and agony and desire and utter gut-wrenching pain. If you've ever seen me in concert, you know that when I perform that song, it becomes a part of me. It's a transforming song for both the audience and me."

Etheridge also says that the studio version is actually a short version of the song since when she performs it live, she improvises a lot which sometimes makes the song last 15 to 20 minutes.

Chart performance
The song did not chart on the US Billboard Hot 100, but it was a minor hit on the Album Rock Tracks chart, where it reached  28. Seven years later, "Like the Way I Do" was re-released as the B-side to Yes I Ams final single, "If I Wanted To"; this allowed the track to chart on the Hot 100 for the first time, peaking at No. 42. Under the then Hot 100 rules, all of the combined retail sales points of the single were given to the A-side, so "Like the Way I Do" charted on radio airplay points alone.

In 1992, a live version of the song that Etheridge performed at the Roxy Theatre in October 1988 was released as a single in the Netherlands and Belgium, peaking at No. 2 in the former country and No. 38 in the latter the following year.

Music video
"Like the Way I Do" was the first Etheridge song for which a video was produced. It was conceived and directed by Tony van den Ende. It shows the singer during a live concert and includes scenes both on stage and backstage. The place at which she is playing is a smaller bar or club with a smoky, rather dark atmosphere. It was produced in 1988 and is also included on the bonus DVD of her album Greatest Hits: The Road Less Traveled.

Track listing
All songs were written by Melissa Etheridge.
A. "Like the Way I Do" – 5:25
B. "Like the Way I Do" (live) – 6:03

Credits and personnelMusicians Melissa Etheridge – acoustic guitar, vocals
 Johnny Lee Schell – guitar
 Kevin McCormick – bass guitar
 Craig Krampf – drumsProduction Melissa Etheridge, Niko Bolas, Craig Krampf, Kevin McCormick – producers
 Chris Blackwell, Rob Fraboni – executive producers
 Allan Blazek, Jim Nipar – engineer
 David Kane – assistant engineer
 Duane Seykora, Bob Vogt – mixing assistants
 Stephen Marcussen – mastering
 Melissa Etheridge, Craig Krampf – arrangers
 George DuBose – photography
 Tony Wright – cover design

Charts

Weekly chartsOriginal versionLive versionYear-end chartsOriginal versionLive version'''

Certifications

Cover versions
 German band 2-4 Grooves recorded the song under the title "The Way I Do" in a house version and released it as a usual single with another song as a B-side and on a remix single including the radio version and three additional remixes. The singles were released in October 2006 but did not chart. The band said that, before the release, the single was presented to Etheridge and she approved the version.
 Elli Erl, the winner of the second season of Deutschland sucht den Superstar (German Idol) performed the song several times during the season: for her original audition, in the first motto show ("My pop idol", finishing fourth out of 13) and in the final as her personal season highlight. In the show's fourth season, candidate Julia Falke performed the song in the second top 20 show making her proceed to the motto shows.

References

 Melissa Etheridge and Laura Morton: The truth is..., Random House 2002
 Greatest Hits: The Road Less Traveled'' bonus DVD

1988 singles
Melissa Etheridge songs
Songs written by Melissa Etheridge
1988 songs
Island Records singles
Song recordings produced by Niko Bolas